St. Martin's Church is a Roman Catholic parish church in Ahetze, Pyrénées-Atlantiques, France. It is dedicated to Saint Martin of Tours. It was registered as an official Historical Monument on June 5, 1973.

Description 
St. Martin Church is located at a crossing point of the Way of St. James. Its construction started in the 16th century. It contains an 18th-century wooden statue of St. James in pilgrim clothing, an 18th-century statue of the Assumption of Mary, an 18th-century altarpiece and a 15th-century processional cross. The arms of this cross are garnished with small bells. During a witch trial in 1609, this cross was considered as a diabolical object by Councillor Pierre de Lancre.

References

External links 
 64009 - Ahetze - Église Saint-Martin , Clochers de France
 Observatoire du Patrimoine religieux 

Churches in Pyrénées-Atlantiques
Monuments historiques of Nouvelle-Aquitaine
16th-century Roman Catholic church buildings in France
18th-century Roman Catholic church buildings in France
16th-century establishments in France